Kloto is a prefecture located in the Plateaux Region of Togo. The prefecture seat is located in Kpalimé. It is home to the Château Vial.

Canton (administrative divisions) of Kloto include Kpalimé, Agomé-Yoh, Lanvié, Hanyigba, Tové, Kpadapé, Gbalavé, Kuma, Kpimé, Woamé, Tomé, Agomé-Tomégbé, Lavié-Apédomé, and Yokélé.

References 

Prefectures of Togo
Plateaux Region, Togo